The Romanov Ransom is the ninth novel in The Fargo Adventures series by Clive Cussler.

Plot
Sam and Remi Fargo go on another quest to discover another lost treasure, this time artifacts that disappeared when the Russian Romanov dynasty came to an end. Their hunt for this treasure takes them through northern Africa, Europe and South America. They find they are not the only ones hunting for this treasure. Others hunt, as well. One group is a shadowy organization known as the Werewolves, which is intent on establishing a Nazi Fourth Reich. Sam and Remi have to watch where they go and what they do at every turn and they do not know who they can trust.

Reviews
Kirkus Reviews liked this novel, saying, "Cussler’s plots sometime slip outside of the box of believability, but he’s always entertaining."The Daily Courier, of Prescott, Arizona, gave another favorable review of this book, saying, "Fans of this series expect nothing less, and “The Romanov Ransom” doesn’t disappoint."

This book was at number four for hardcover fiction on The New York Times bestseller list for October 1, 2017.

References

2017 American novels
Novels by Clive Cussler
Fargo Adventures
American thriller novels
Collaborative novels
G. P. Putnam's Sons books
Michael Joseph books